Lucas LaRochelle is a Canadian artist and designer based in Montreal, Quebec. They are best known as the creator of the community-based online collaborative mapping platform Queering the Map.

Early life and education 
LaRochelle grew up in Ontario. In 2016, they received a certificate in Co-Design from HU University of Applied Sciences Utrecht. LaRochelle currently lives in Montreal, where they are pursuing a bachelor's degree in Design and Computation Arts with a minor in Interdisciplinary Studies in Sexuality at Concordia University.

Work
LaRochelle's artistic work primarily explores community archives, internet studies and queer geography. Notably, they have produced a number of works of wearable art. As a designer, Larochelle has created websites for Concordia University's Planetary Futures Summer School and student-run V.A.V. Gallery and has designed books, catalogues and posters.

Exhibitions 
LaRochelle has exhibited their work prolifically in Montreal, including at artist-run centre Articule, at Concordia's Milieux Institute for Arts, Culture and Technology and as part of Pop Montreal. They have also exhibited internationally in Austria, the Netherlands, the UK and the U.S., including at Somerset House in London and Onomatopee Projects in Eindhoven.

Queering the Map 
In May 2017, LaRochelle launched the community-based collaborative mapping platform Queering the Map, on which users submit their personal queer experiences to specific locations on a single collective map. LaRochelle has cited the lasting impact of personal memories on their perceptions towards places and Sara Ahmed's ideas on queerness as an orientation towards space as influences behind the project. In February 2018, a cyberattack generating pins with comments in support of U.S. president Donald Trump forced LaRochelle to take down the site, relaunching it in April 2018. Since its inception, users have contributed over 80,000 submissions in 23 languages to the platform.

In 2018, LaRochelle received an honorary mention at the Prix Ars Electronica and was longlisted for the Kantar Information is Beautiful Awards and the Lumen Prize for Digital Art for their work on Queering the Map. They have given numerous lectures and workshops on and around the project in Canada, the Netherlands, Puerto Rico, Switzerland and the U.S., including at the Museum of the Moving Image in New York, the University of Puerto Rico, Río Piedras Campus's School of Architecture in San Juan and the OTHERWISE festival in Zurich.

In 2019, LaRochelle began developing QT.bot, an artificial neural network trained to generate hypothetical queer stories using the data submitted to Queering the Map.

References 

21st-century Canadian artists
Artists from Montreal
Canadian contemporary artists
Interdisciplinary artists
Living people
Year of birth missing (living people)